Christian Coffinet (born 1923) is a 20th-century French journalist, novelist, and screenwriter, winner of the prix des Deux Magots in 1949.

Christian Coffinet adapted some of his novels for cinema, particularly La Fille de proie for the film  (1958) by Guy Lefranc.

Works 
1948: Les Voyous, éditions du Pavois
1948: Autour de Chérubine, éditions Fournier-Valdè — prix des Deux Magots 1949
1949: Le Quatrième Commandement, éditions Fournier-Valdès
1949: Merveilleuse, éditions du Pavois
1949: Sale Coin, éditions Fournier-Valdès
1953: La Fille de proie, 
1955: Les Jeux de mains, éditions du Scorpion
1955: Les Propositions malhonnêtes, éditions du Scorpion
1956: La Poudre aux yeux, éditions du Scorpion
1974: Le Détonateur, Fayard
1976: La Danse du cobaye, éditions Jean-Claude Lattès
1977: Qui se sent bien en Malaisie ?, éditions Jean-Claude Lattès
1977: La Jambe de mon père, éditions Jean-Claude Lattès

External links 

20th-century French novelists
20th-century French male writers
Prix des Deux Magots winners
1923 births
Living people